The Connecticut Association was a Class D level minor league baseball league that played in the 1910 season. The four–team Connecticut Association consisted of franchises based exclusively in Connecticut. The Connecticut Association, also called the Eastern Connecticut League, folded during their charter season.

History
The Connecticut Association began play in the 1910 season, formed as a Class D level league, with Daniel Dunn serving as league president. Dunn also served as manager of the Willimantic Colts.

The 1910 Connecticut Association was a four–team league that began play on May 10, 1910. The league was formed with the Middletown Jewels, New London Whalers, Norwich Bonbons and Willimantic Colts as charter members. On July 10, 1910, the Norwich Bonbons disbanded. The Norwich team was transferred to Meriden, Connecticut on July 15, 1910, with the franchise playing as the Meriden Doublins. Meriden disbanded on July 24, 1914. The Connecticut Association permanently disbanded on August 4, 1910.

The New London Whalers were in 1st place when the Connecticut Association folded on August 4, 1910. New London finished with a record of 32–25 under manager Charles Hupmhrey. New London was followed by the Middletown Jewels (26–24), Norwich Bonbons / Meriden Doublins (19–25) and Willimantic Colts (19–28) in the final league standings.

The Reach Official American League Guide publication (p.553) listed Middletown as the Connecticut Association winner with a 35–30 record, citing the season ending on September 10,1910.

The Connecticut Association did not return to play after folding in 1910.

Connecticut Association teams

Standings & statistics

1910 Connecticut Association
Norwich (19–12) disbanded July 10 and moved to Meriden July 15; Meriden disbanded July 24.The season officially ended August 4.

References

Defunct minor baseball leagues in the United States
Baseball leagues in Connecticut
Defunct professional sports leagues in the United States
Sports leagues established in 1910
Sports leagues disestablished in 1910